A Summary View of the Rights of British America was a tract written by Thomas Jefferson in 1774, before the U.S. Declaration of Independence, in which he laid out for delegates to the First Continental Congress a set of grievances against King George III, especially against the King's and the Parliament of Great Britain's response to the Boston Tea Party. Jefferson declares that the Parliament did not have the right to govern the Thirteen Colonies. He argues that since the individual colonies were founded they were independent of British rule. 

Jefferson, in this work, held that allodial title, not feudal title, was held to American lands, and thus the people did not owe fees and rents for that land to the British crown. 

Despite being a life-long slave owner, Jefferson included a strong condemnation of slavery in the tract, writing "The abolition of domestic slavery is the great object of desire in those colonies, where it was unhappily introduced in their infant state. But previous to the enfranchisement of the slaves we have, it is necessary to exclude all further importations from Africa; yet our repeated attempts to effect this by prohibitions, and by imposing duties which might amount to a prohibition, have been hitherto defeated by his majesty's negative: Thus preferring the immediate advantages of a few African corsairs to the lasting interests of the American states, and to the rights of human nature, deeply wounded by this infamous practice."

The work was presented to, and debated by, the First Continental Congress. When this took place, Jefferson did not attend. Despite his attempts, Congress agreed to a more moderate decision than Jefferson's proposed concept. Despite not being able to completely convince Congress, friends of Jefferson printed the Summary in a pamphlet form. It was distributed throughout London, New York and Philadelphia. Research states that the document "helped establish Jefferson's reputation as a skillful, if radical, political writer."

References

Footnotes

Text
 Text in modernized spelling and format

Sources

This article incorporates text from a webpage created by the World Digital Library, which is written and created by the Federal government of the United States and is thus in the public domain.

Documents of the American Revolution
1774 non-fiction books
1774 in the Thirteen Colonies
Works by Thomas Jefferson
American political philosophy literature
George III of the United Kingdom
Abolitionism in the United States
Continental Congress
Pamphlets